Eskers Provincial Park is a provincial park in British Columbia, Canada. Located west of Nukko Lake, which lies northwest of the city of Prince George, it protects an area of the  Stuart River Eskers Complex. Eskers are winding ridges of gravel formed by the glaciers which once covered the British Columbia Interior.

References
 BC Parks - Eskers Provincial Park
 

Provincial parks of British Columbia
1987 establishments in British Columbia
Protected areas established in 1987